Karlushka (Karlu) is a rural locality (a settlement) in Mayminskoye Rural Settlement of Mayminsky District, the Altai Republic, Russia. The population was 442 as of 2016. There are 4 streets.

Geography 
Karlushka is located on the Katun River, 4 km southwest of Mayma (the district's administrative centre) by road. Mayma is the nearest rural locality.

References 

Rural localities in Mayminsky District